Geoff Morgan  is an Australian businessman, known for co-founding Morgan & Banks with Andrew Banks.

Career
Morgan co-founded Morgan & Banks, a recruitment agency with Andrew Banks in 1985. It became a public company in 1995. He joined Bank's Talent2 International in 2003.

Scouting
Morgan has been a member of the World Scout Foundation, the World Organization of the Scout Movement's trust company, and has represented the foundation served on the World Scout Committee since 2021.

Recognition 
In 2015 Morgan was inducted into the Order of Australia. Together with Andrew Banks, was voted equal first in an industry poll of The 5 Most Influential People in the Recruitment Industry in the past 60 years.

In 2014, Morgan and Banks were inaugural inductees to the Recruitment International (Australia) Recruitment Industry Hall of Fame, for individuals who have made significant contribution to the Australian recruitment industry during their career.

In 2004, Morgan and Banks won the Ernst & Young Australia, Master Entrepreneur of the Year Award (Eastern Region) for sustained success in business.

Books
 Flourish & Prosper (2005);
 Achieving Your Dream Career (2002);
 The Morgan and Banks Guide to: Getting That Job (1994);
 Going Up - How to Get, Keep and Advance Your Career (1988)

References

External links
 

Members of the Order of Australia
World Scout Committee members
Human resource management people
Living people
Year of birth missing (living people)
Australian investors